Pierre-Henri Clostermann  (28 February 1921 – 22 March 2006) was a World War II French fighter pilot.

During the conflict he achieved 33 air-to-air combat victories, earning the accolade "France's First Fighter" from General Charles de Gaulle. His wartime memoir, The Big Show (Le Grand Cirque) became a notable bestseller. After the war, he worked as an engineer and was the youngest Member of France's Parliament.

Early life
Clostermann was born in Curitiba, Brazil, into a French diplomatic family. He was the only son of Madeleine Carlier from Lorraine and Jacques Clostermann from Alsace. After receiving flying tuition from German pilot Karl Benitz (died in 1943, Russia), he completed his secondary education in France and gained his private pilot's licence in 1937.

World War II
On the outbreak of war in 1939 the French authorities refused his application for service, so he travelled to Los Angeles to become a commercial pilot, studying at the California Institute of Technology. Clostermann joined the Free French Air Force in the United Kingdom in March 1942. After training at RAF Cranwell and 61 OTU, Clostermann, a sergeant pilot, was posted in January 1943 to No. 341 Squadron RAF (known to the Free French as Groupe de Chasse n° 3/2 "Alsace"), flying the Supermarine Spitfire.

On 15 July 1943 he crash-landed after combat when unable to lower his undercarriage (Cat.B). He scored his first two victories on 27 July 1943, also as Yellow 2, claiming destruction of two Focke-Wulf Fw 190s over France.
In October 1943, Clostermann received a commission as an officer, and was assigned to the British No. 602 Squadron RAF, remaining with the unit for the next ten months. He flew a variety of operations including fighter sweeps, bomber escorts, high-altitude interdiction over the Royal Navy's Scapa Flow base, and strafing or dive-bombing attacks on V-1 launch sites on the French coast. He flew air-cover for the Normandy Landings, and was one of the first Free French pilots to land on French soil, at temporary airstrip B-11, near Longues-sur-Mer, Normandy on 18 June 1944. He was awarded the Distinguished Flying Cross shortly afterwards, after which he was reassigned to French Air Force Headquarters.

In December 1944 he returned to the front line on re-secondment to the Royal Air Force as a supernumerary flight lieutenant. He joined No. 274 Squadron RAF flying the new Hawker Tempest Mk V. In an aircraft which he named Le Grand Charles, Clostermann flew an intensive and highly successful round of fighter sweeps, airfield attacks, "rat scramble" interceptions of Messerschmitt 262 jet fighters, and rail interdiction missions over northern Germany over the next two months.

In March 1945 he briefly served with No. 56 Squadron, before transfer to No. 3 Squadron. On 24 March 1945 he was wounded in the leg by German flak, and after belly-landing his badly damaged aircraft was hospitalised for a week. From 8 April 1945 he was commander of "A" Flight, No. 3 Squadron RAF. He was awarded a bar to his DFC.

On 12 May 1945 during a victory fly-past to mark the war's conclusion, another Tempest collided with his, and as a result an air pile-up occurred with four close formation low-flying aeroplanes of his flight involved, with three pilots being killed. Clostermann bailed out, his parachute opening just a few metres above the ground. He continued operations with No. 122 Wing RAF until he left the military altogether on 27 July 1945 with the RAF rank of wing commander and the French rank of lieutenant.

In his 432 sorties, Clostermann was credited officially with 33 victories (19 solo, 14 shared, most of them against fighters) and five "probables", with eight more "damaged". He also claimed 225 motor vehicles destroyed, 72 locomotives, five tanks, and two E-boats (fast torpedo boats). Many references credit him with 29 to 33 victories, although these probably include his "ground" kills of enemy aircraft. Recent, more detailed analysis of his combat reports and squadron accounts indicate that his actual score was 11 destroyed, with possibly another seven, for a total of 15–18 victories.

Later life
In 1951, Clostermann authored an account of his wartime experiences entitled Le Grand Cirque (published in English as The Big Show). One of the first post-war fighter pilot memoirs, its various editions have sold over two and a half million copies. William Faulkner commented that this is the finest aviation book to come out of World War II. The book was reprinted, in expanded form, in both paperback and hardcover editions in 2004. It was also adapted in comic book form by Manuel Perales, in close collaboration with Clostermann. Clostermann also wrote Feux du Ciel (Flames in the Sky) published in  1957, a collection of heroic air combat exploits from both Allied and Axis sides.

After the war, Clostermann continued his career as an engineer, participating in the creation of Reims Aviation, supporting the Max Holste Broussard prototype, acting as a representative for Cessna, and working for Renault.

He served eight terms as a député (member of parliament) in the French National Assembly between 1946 and 1969.

He also briefly re-enlisted in the Armée de l'Air in 1956–57 to fly ground-attack missions during the Algerian War. He subsequently published a novel based on his experiences there, entitled Leo 25 Airborne.

During the Falklands War in early 1982 comments publicly emerged from Clostermann expressing praise for the courage displayed by Argentine Air Force and Argentine Navy pilots during their air-to-sea attacks on the Royal Navy. Clostermann had written the comments, which were partly motivated by ethnic insults towards Argentinians that he had become aware of in the British press during the conflict, in a letter to a class of Argentine fighter-pilots who were being trained at that time in France at an Armée de l'Air establishment, at which his son was an instructor. The private letter's comments, from a renowned World War II military hero, swiftly found their way across the Atlantic Ocean to Buenos Aires, where they were published in newspapers as war propaganda. As a result of this perceived "betrayal" of his links with the United Kingdom via his war service in the Royal Air Force, Clostermann attracted hostility from parts of the British press.

He also attracted controversy in France for his vehement anti-war stance in the run-up to the 1991 Gulf War.

Death
Clostermann died on 22 March 2006 at his home at Montesquieu-des-Albères, in the French Pyrenees.

Private life
Clostermann was married and had three sons.

Honours

On 6 June 2004, a road in Longues-sur-Mer, near temporary airstrip B-11, was named after Clostermann.

French decorations

Foreign orders and decorations

References

Notes

Bibliography
 Clostermann, Pierre. The Big Show. (Translated by Oliver Berthoud) London: Weidenfeld & Nicolson, 2004. .

 Shores, Christopher and Clive Williams. Aces High. London: Grub Street, 1994. .
 Thomas, Chris. Typhoon and Tempest Aces of World War 2. Aircraft of the Aces No. 27. Botley, Oxford, UK: Osprey Publishing, 1999. .
 Wings Encyclopedia of Aviation. London: Orbis Publishing, 1979.

External links

Official website with unique content
Ordre de la Libération: Pierre Clostermann (French)
Site dedicated to Pierre Clostermann

1921 births
2006 deaths
People from Curitiba
Democratic and Socialist Union of the Resistance politicians
Rally of the French People politicians
Radical Party (France) politicians
Union for the New Republic politicians
Union of Democrats for the Republic politicians
Members of the Constituent Assembly of France (1946)
Deputies of the 1st National Assembly of the French Fourth Republic
Deputies of the 2nd National Assembly of the French Fourth Republic
Deputies of the 3rd National Assembly of the French Fourth Republic
Deputies of the 2nd National Assembly of the French Fifth Republic
Deputies of the 3rd National Assembly of the French Fifth Republic
Deputies of the 4th National Assembly of the French Fifth Republic
Lycée Hoche alumni
French Air and Space Force personnel
French World War II pilots
French World War II flying aces
Free French military personnel of World War II
French Royal Air Force pilots of World War II
Knights of the Holy Sepulchre
Companions of the Liberation
Grand Croix of the Légion d'honneur
Recipients of the Croix de Guerre 1939–1945 (France)
Recipients of the Cross for Military Valour
Recipients of the Resistance Medal
Recipients of the Aeronautical Medal
Recipients of the Croix de guerre (Belgium)
Knights of the Order of the Dannebrog
Recipients of the Distinguished Flying Cross (United Kingdom)
Recipients of the Distinguished Service Cross (United States)